Stanislav Štech (born  23 August 1954) is a Czech politician and psychologist. From June to December 2017, he was the Minister of Education, Youth and Sports of the Czech Republic in the Cabinet of Bohuslav Sobotka.

On June 23, 2011, he was awarded the grade of Officer of the Order of Academic Palms for his contributions to education and training.

References 

1954 births
Living people
Education ministers of the Czech Republic
People from Louny District
Czech Social Democratic Party Government ministers
Czech psychologists
Charles University alumni
Lycée Carnot alumni
Czech educators
Officiers of the Ordre des Palmes Académiques